Helena Javornik (born 26 March 1966, in Celje) is a Slovenian long-distance runner who has specialized in all distances from 1500 metres to the marathon race.

She holds the current national record in 10,000 m with 31:06.63 minutes, achieved at the 2004 Summer Olympics.

She won the Ljubljana Marathon three times consecutively between 1996 and 1998. Her course record of 2:32:33 went unbettered for eleven years.

She tested positive for EPO in March 2008 and was banned for two years by the International Association of Athletics Federations in June 2008. The ban was upheld by the Court of Arbitration for Sport; she will next be eligible to compete in June 2010.

Achievements

Personal bests
1500 metres - 4:06.77 min (2000)
3000 metres - 8:50.71 min (2000)
5000 metres - 15:15.40 min (1999)
10,000 metres - 31:06.63 min (2004)
Half marathon - 1:09:22 hrs (2004)
Marathon - 2:27:33 hrs (2004)

References

External links
 
 

1966 births
Living people
Slovenian female middle-distance runners
Slovenian female long-distance runners
Slovenian female marathon runners
Olympic athletes of Slovenia
Athletes (track and field) at the 1996 Summer Olympics
Athletes (track and field) at the 2000 Summer Olympics
Athletes (track and field) at the 2004 Summer Olympics
Doping cases in athletics
Sportspeople from Celje
Slovenian sportspeople in doping cases
European Cross Country Championships winners
Slovenian female cross country runners
Mediterranean Games gold medalists for Slovenia
Mediterranean Games medalists in athletics
Athletes (track and field) at the 1993 Mediterranean Games
Athletes (track and field) at the 2001 Mediterranean Games